Bear JJ1 (2004 – 26 June 2006) was a brown bear whose travels and exploits in Austria and Germany in the first half of 2006 drew international attention. JJ1, also known as Bruno in the German press (some newspapers also gave the bear different names, such as Beppo or Petzi), is believed to have been the first brown bear on German soil in 170 years.

Origin 

JJ1 was originally part of an EU-funded €1 million conservation project in Italy, but had walked across to Austria and into Germany. A spokesman said that there had been "co-ordination" between Italy, Austria and Slovenia to ensure the bear's welfare but apparently Germany had not been informed. The Life Ursus reintroduction project of the Italian province of Trento had introduced 10 Slovenian bears in the region, monitoring them. JJ1 was the first son of Jurka and Joze (thus the name JJ1); his younger brother JJ3 also showed an aggressive character, wandered into Switzerland in 2008, and was killed there. Because of this second problem the mother Jurka was put in captivity in Italy, despite protests by environmentalists; park authorities maintained that 50% of the incidents involving bears had been caused by Jurka or her descendants.

Overview 

Previously, the last sighting of a bear in what is now Germany was recorded in 1838 when hunters shot a bear in Bavaria. Initially heralded as a welcome visitor and a symbol of the success of endangered species reintroduction programs, JJ1's dietary preferences for sheep, chickens, and beehives led government officials to believe that he could become a threat to humans, and they ordered that he be shot or captured. Public objection to the order resulted in its revision, and the German government tried to use non-lethal means to sedate and capture the bear instead. 

JJ1 was described as bloodthirsty, clever, and fast. Bavarian minister-president Edmund Stoiber referred to him as a Problembär ("problem bear"). Farmers claimed the bear "enjoyed killing," because he typically killed sheep without eating them. This behavior, called surplus killing, common among predators, was construed as being caused by interaction with people. As of 21 June 2006, his kills included 33 sheep, four domestic rabbits, one guinea pig, as well as some hens and goats. Further concern was expressed due to the proximity of the bear's preferred prey to humans.

It was reported that several attempts were made to catch JJ1 alive, assisted by a team of Finnish bear hunters using five dogs (which were described in the press as either Karelian Bear Dogs or Elkhounds). The attempts failed, and JJ1 was shot at Rotwand mountain (see Miesbach (district)) near Lake Spitzingsee in southern Bavaria in the early morning of 26 June 2006.

JJ1 became a subject of diplomatic strife. The Italian government in Rome declared JJ1 to be state property of Italy, and demanded his return. The Bavarian government, where JJ1 was shot dead, refused, claiming that a carcass on German land is theirs to keep. JJ1 has been stuffed, and is currently on display at the Museum of Man and Nature in Munich.

See also
 List of individual bears

References

See also
Bear 71
 List of individual bears

External links
 Bavaria's Wild Bear Summer SPIEGEL ONLINE Photo Gallery

2004 animal births
Individual bears
Nature conservation in Germany
2006 animal deaths
Individual wild animals
Individual taxidermy exhibits